Tywappity Township is an inactive township in Mississippi County, in the U.S. state of Missouri.

Tywappity is a name possibly derived from the Shawnee language.

References

Townships in Missouri
Townships in Mississippi County, Missouri